Horimbo (1039—1092) was a chieftain of the Wanyan tribe, the most dominant among the Jurchen tribes which later founded the Jin dynasty (1115–1234). He was the second son of Ukunai. Like his grandfather, Šilu, Horimbo was appointed chieftain of the Wanyan tribe by the Khitan-led Liao dynasty, which ruled northern China between the 10th and 11th centuries.

In 1145, Horimbo was posthumously honoured with the temple name Shizu (世祖) by his descendant, Emperor Xizong of the Jin dynasty.

Family
Parents
 Father: Ukunai
 Mother: Lady Tankko (唐括氏), posthumously honoured as Empress Zhaosu (昭肃皇后)
Consorts and issue
Empress Yijian, of the Nalan clan (翼簡皇后 拏懶氏, d. 1085)
Wanyan Uyašu, Emperor Kangzong (金康宗完顏烏雅束, 1061 – 1113), 1st son
Wanyan Aguda, Emperor Taizu (金太祖完顏阿骨打, 1 August 1068 – 19 September 1123), 2nd son
Wanyan Odai (斡帶), Prince Dingsu of Wei (魏定肅王 完顏斡带), 3rd son
Wanyan Sheng, Emperor Taizong (金太宗完顏晟, 25 November 1075 – 9 February 1135), 4th son
Wanyan Gao, Prince Zhilie of Liao (遼智烈王 完顏杲, d. September 1130), 5th son
Concubine, of the Tudan clan (次室徒单氏)
Wnayan Osei, Prince of Wei (衛王完顏斡賽), 6th son
Wanyan Oje, Prince of Lu (魯王 完顏斡者), 7th son
Concubine, of the Pusan clan (次室仆散氏)
Wanyan Wugunai, Prince of Han (漢王 完顏烏故乃), 8th son
Concubine, of Šuhu clan (次室术虎氏)
Wanyan Dumu, Prince Zhuangxiang of Lu (魯莊襄王 完顏闍母), 9th son
Concubine, of Šuhu clan (次室术虎氏)
Wanyan Chala, Prince of Yi (沂王 完顏查剌), 10th son
Concubine, of the Ukurin clan (烏古論氏)
 Wanyan Ang, Prince of Yun (鄆王 完顏昂), 11th son

References

Citations

Sources 

 Jing-shen Tao, The Jurchen in Twelfth-Century China. University of Washington Press, 1976, .
 

Jurchen rulers
1039 births
1092 deaths